The Rural Municipality of Kellross No. 247 is a rural municipality (RM) in the Canadian province of Saskatchewan within Census Division No. 10 and  Division No. 4.

History 
The RM of Kellross No. 247 incorporated as a rural municipality on December 13, 1909. Its name is a blend of Kelliher and Leross.

Geography

Communities and localities 
The following urban municipalities are surrounded by the RM.

Villages
 Kelliher
 Leross
 Lestock

The following unincorporated communities are within the RM.

Localities
 Enid
 McDonald Hills

Demographics 

Attractions 
 Kelliher & District Museum
 Kellross Heritage Museum
 Touchwood Hills Post Provincial Historic Park

Government 
The RM of Kellross No. 247 is governed by an elected municipal council and an appointed administrator that meets on the seventh day of the month of every month. The reeve of the RM is John Olinik while its administrator is Edith Goddard. The RM's office is located in Leross.

Transportation 
 Saskatchewan Highway 15
 Saskatchewan Highway 35
 Saskatchewan Highway 639
 Saskatchewan Highway 731
 Canadian National Railway

See also 
List of rural municipalities in Saskatchewan
List of geographic names derived from portmanteaus

References 

 
K
Division No. 10, Saskatchewan